Live at the Gillioz is a limited edition two DVD set concert film release by country rock band the Ozark Mountain Daredevils. The concert was taped on May 10, 11 & 12 2007, at the Gillioz Theatre in Springfield, Missouri. It features over two hours of music by the Daredevils including never before released songs. The DVD was sold only through their official website.

Track listing

Special Features
Conversations with the original members
Photogallery
Rehearsal footage

Personnel
Steve Cash - harmonica, harpsichord, percussion, vocals
John Dillon - guitar, mandolin, fiddle, dulcimer, autoharp, keyboards, percussion, vocals
Larry Lee - guitar, keyboards, drums, percussion, vocals, saw
Randle Chowning - guitar, harmonica, vocals
Michael Granda - bass, percussion, vocals
Buddy Brayfield - piano, keyboards
Elizabeth Anderson - Backing Vocals
Sidney Cash - Backing Vocals
Janet Lee - Backing Vocals
Donald Bromage - Backing Vocals

References

2008 live albums
The Ozark Mountain Daredevils albums
Albums produced by Glyn Johns
A&M Records live albums